Robert Shapland Carew, 2nd Baron Carew KP (28 January 1818 – 9 September 1881) was an Irish Member of Parliament in the Parliament of the United Kingdom from 1840 to 1847, and a member of the Irish and United Kingdom peerages.

He was born in Dublin, the son of Robert Carew, 1st Baron Carew, and his wife Jane Catherine Cliffe.  He was educated at his father's alma mater Eton College and Christ Church, University of Oxford.  He married Emily Anne Philips, daughter of Sir George Richard Philips, 2nd Baronet, in 1844.  They had two sons:

 Robert Shapland George Julian Carew, 3rd Baron Carew (1860–1923)
 George Patrick John Carew, 4th Baron Carew (1863–1926)

He was Liberal Party Member of Parliament for Waterford County between 1840 and 1847. He was appointed High Sheriff of County Waterford for 1848.

On his father's death he became the 2nd Baron Carew, in both the Peerage of Ireland and the Peerage of the United Kingdom and also succeeded him as Lord Lieutenant of County Wexford, a position he held until 1881. In 1872 he was made a knight of the Order of St. Patrick.

Notes

References
Kidd, Charles & Williamson, David (eds.) (1990) Debrett's Peerage and Baronetage (1990 edition). New York: St Martin's Press,

External links 
 

1818 births
1881 deaths
People educated at Eton College
Alumni of Christ Church, Oxford
Members of the Parliament of the United Kingdom for County Waterford constituencies (1801–1922)
Knights of St Patrick
Lord-Lieutenants of Wexford
UK MPs 1837–1841
UK MPs 1841–1847
UK MPs who inherited peerages
High Sheriffs of County Waterford
Robert 2
Eldest sons of British hereditary barons